Cuban Fury is a 2014 British romantic comedy film directed by James Griffiths, written by Jon Brown, and starring Nick Frost, Rashida Jones and Chris O'Dowd. The film was a minor box office success but received mixed reviews from critics.

Plot
Bruce Garrett, a former teen salsa champion with his sister Sam, is now an engineer. Bruce gave up dancing after he was brutally bullied and traumatized by older boys on his way to the Nationals final. 

25 years later, after Bruce has a meet cute moment with his new American boss, Julia, he hears she is passionate about salsa dancing. So, he decides that the only way he can win her over is by re-mastering the art of dance. He seeks out his old teacher Ron, who forces him to confront the reasons he quit dancing in the first place. 

Bruce struggles with low self-esteem due to his weight, as well as his constantly bullying coworker and rival, Drew. He continually dominates Julia's attention, a romantic interest for Bruce but strictly sexual for Drew. 

With the help of his salsa classmates, teacher, and his former dancing partner, his sister Sam, Bruce gets up the courage to relearn all his 'rusty' dance steps and to recapture his lost "corazón" (heart), not only for the dance but for his life. 

Convinced by his classmate Bejan to go to a salsa club, Bruce is given a mini makeover at home. The transformation includes shaving his chest hair and use a bronzer. At the club there are more people from the class. As Bruce is dancing with his instructor, Ron openly criticize his passionless move. Insensed by the bullying, he geatly improved, but when seeing Drew with Julia on the dance floor is dejected. His salsa friends see the deflated Bruce leaving. 

Thanks to Ron seeing Bruce at the club, he agrees to train Bruce. Again encouraging him with mild bullying, Ron pushes him hard until he starts to see results. Bruce has a mini dance-off with Drew at their lunch break, giving him a burst of self-confidence.

When ready, Bruce's friends convince him to enter the local nightclub's salsa dance competition, with the idea that he'll invite Julia to be his dance partner. But when he goes round to hers to ask her out to the dance, he is tricked into believing that he's interrupting an intimate evening she's spending with Drew, so leaves before asking, disillusioned. 

Julia, meanwhile, discovers what Drew is up to and outright rejects his advances, then kicks him out whilst threatening his position at work. Julia discovers the salsa mixtape was from him, not Drew so follows Bruce to the nightclub. There he's been doing quite well with Sam and an old routine, and is about to enter the final heat/round of the competition. 

When he notices Julia had followed him to the club, he's elated and finally plucks up the courage to ask her to dance. They dance the last round of the competition, where Bruce goes on to lose the competition, but regains his true self and finally wins Julia's heart.

Cast
 Nick Frost as Bruce Garrett
 Rashida Jones as Julia
 Chris O'Dowd as Drew
 Ian McShane as Ron
 Olivia Colman as Sam Garrett
 Wendi McLendon-Covey as Carly 
 Alexandra Roach as Helen
 Rory Kinnear as Gary
 Kayvan Novak as Bejan
 Simon Pegg (cameo) as Ginger Mondeo driver
 Chris Wilson as Chief Executive Officer
 The Cuban Brothers as MC's during dance contest

Release

Critical response
The film received mixed reviews from critics. On review aggregator website Rotten Tomatoes, it has a 54% score based on 96 reviews, with an average rating of 5.54/10. The site's consensus states: "Nick Frost and Chris O'Dowd remain as undeniably likable as ever, but Cuban Fury saddles them with a contrived and predictable plot that's far too short on laughs." Metacritic gives a weighted average score of 52 out of 100 rating based on reviews from 21 critics, indicating "mixed or average reviews".

Soundtrack
Decca Records released the Cuban Fury soundtrack on 17 February 2014.

References

External links
 
 
 
 
 

2014 films
2010s Persian-language films
2010s French-language films
2014 romantic comedy films
British romantic comedy films
British dance films
Films set in 1987
Films set in 2012
Films shot in London
Big Talk Productions films
Film4 Productions films
StudioCanal films
2010s dance films
Films scored by Daniel Pemberton
2014 directorial debut films
Films shot at Elstree Film Studios
2010s English-language films
2010s British films
2014 multilingual films
British multilingual films